Horizon is a recording by the jazz musician Sun Ra and his Astro-Intergalactic-Infinity Arkestra, forming part of the documentation of their first visit to Egypt.

It was recorded at the Ballon Theatre, Cairo.

In various editions, the record has sometimes been known by the other title of "Starwatchers"

Track listing
Original LP:
"Starwatchers/Theme of the Stargazers"
"Discipline 2" 
"Shadow World" 
"Third Planet" 
"Space Is the Place"
"Horizon" 
"Discipline 8"
CD reissue:

Personnel
John Gilmore - tenor saxophone
Danny Davis - alto saxophone, flute
Marshall Allen - alto saxophone, flute, oboe
Kwame Hadi - trumpet, conga drums
Pat Patrick - baritone saxophone
Elo Omoe - bass clarinet
Tommy Hunter - percussion
Danny Ray Thompson - baritone saxophone, flute
June Tyson - vocal
Larry Narthington - alto saxophone, conga drum
Lex Humphries - percussion
Clifford Jarvis - percussion
Hakim Rahim - alto saxophone, flute
Sun Ra - organ, Mini Moog, piano
Tam Fiofori - engineer

References

Sun Ra live albums
1972 live albums
Live free jazz albums
El Saturn Records live albums